Elections to East Ayrshire Council were held on 3 May 2012, the same day as the other Scottish local government elections. The election is the second using 9 new wards created as a result of the Local Governance (Scotland) Act 2004, each ward elected three or four councillors using the single transferable vote system form of proportional representation. The new wards replaced 32 single-member wards which used the plurality (first past the post) system of election.

Election result

Note: "Votes" are the first preference votes. The net gain/loss and percentage changes relate to the result of the previous Scottish local elections on 3 May 2007. This may differ from other published sources showing gain/loss relative to seats held at dissolution of Scotland's councils.

Seats changing hands

Ward summary

|- class="unsortable" align="centre"
! rowspan="2" style="text-align:left;"|Ward
! %
!Cllrs
! %
!Cllrs
! %
!Cllrs
! %
!Cllrs
! %
!Cllrs
!rowspan=2|TotalCllrs
|- class="unsortable" style="text-align:center;"
!colspan=2|SNP
!colspan=2|Labour
!colspan=2|Conservative
!colspan=2|Lib Dem
!colspan=2|Independent
|-
|align="left"|Annick
|
|1
|
|1
|
|0
|
|0
|
|1
|3
|-
|align="left"|Kilmarnock North
|
|2
|
|1
|
|0
|colspan=2 
|colspan=2 
|3
|-
|Kilmarnock West and Crosshouse
|
|2
|
|1
|
|1
|colspan=2 
|
|0
|4
|-
|align="left"|Kilmarnock East and Hurlford
|
|2
|
|2
|
|0
|colspan=2 
|colspan=2 
| 4
|-
|align="left"|Kilmarnock South
|
|2
|
|1
|
|0
|colspan=2 
|colspan=2 
|3
|-
|align="left"|Irvine Valley
|
|2
|
|1
|
|1
|colspan=2 
|
|0
|4
|-
|align="left"|Ballochmyle
|
|2
|
|2
|
|0
|colspan=2 
|colspan=2 
|4
|-
|align="left"|Cumnock and New Cumnock
|
|1
|
|3
|
|0
|colspan=2 
|
|0
|4
|-
|align="left"|Doon Valley
|
|1
|
|2
|
|0
|colspan=2 
|
|0
|3
|- class="unsortable"
!align="left"|Total
!
!15
!
!14
!
!2
!
!0
!
!1
!32
|}

Ward results

Annick
The SNP and Labour retained the seats they had won at the previous election while independent candidate Ellen Freel gained a seat from the Conservatives

Kilmarnock North
The SNP (2) and Labour retained the seats they won at the previous election.

Kilmarnock West and Crosshouse
The SNP (2), Labour and the Conservatives retained the seats they had won at the previous election.

Kilmarnock East and Hurlford
The SNP (2) and Labour (2) retained the seats they had won at the previous election.

Kilmarnock South
The SNP (2) and Labour retained the seats they had won at the previous election.

Irvine Valley
The SNP (2), Labour and the Conservatives retained the seats they had won at the previous election.

Ballochmyle
Labour retained two of the three seats they had won at the previous election while the SNP held their only seat and gained one seat from Labour.

Cumnock and New Cumnock
Labour (3) and the SNP retained the seats that they had won at the previous election.

Doon Valley
The SNP and Labour retained the seats they had won at the previous election while Labour gained one seat from independent councillor Jim Sutherland. In 2007, independent candidate Drew Filson was elected as an SNP councillor but subsequently left the party. A by-election held following the death of Cllr Sutherland in 2009 was won by Labour.

By-elections from 2012–2017

Kilmarnock North

Irvine Valley

Kilmarnock East and Hurlford

Notes

References

2012 Scottish local elections
2012